The Evangelical-Reformed Church of the Canton of St. Gallen is a Reformed state cantonal church in the canton of St. Gallen.

The church was founded in 1803. It has in 2004 122,500 members and 55 congregations served by 120 pastors. Congregations are in St. Gallen, Goldach, Rorschach, Gossau, Gaiserwald, Thal-Lutzenberg, Rheineck, St. Marghrete, Balbach, Marbach, Rebstein, Altstatten, Salez-Haag, Uznach, Sevelen, Eichberg, Sax-Frümsen, Wil, Krinau, Flavil and others in St. gallen. The Church has links with the Evangelical Church in Liechtenstein.

The headquarters of the church are in St Gallen, Toggenburg and Rheintal
The church has Presbyterian-Synodal church government.

Member of the Federation of Swiss Protestant Churches. Women ordination is allowed. Blessing of same-sex unions is allowed.

External links 
Reformed Church in St.Gallen

References 

Canton of St. Gallen
SaintGall